Count Carlo Sforza (24 January 1872 – 4 September 1952) was an Italian diplomat and anti-fascist politician.

Life and career

Sforza was born at Lucca, the second son of Count Giovanni Sforza (1846-1922), an archivist and noted historian from Montignoso, Tuscany, and Elisabetta Pierantoni, born in a family of rich silk merchants. His father was a descendant of the Counts of Castel San Giovanni, an illegitimate branch of the House of Sforza who had ruled the Duchy of Milan in the fifteenth and sixteenth centuries. At the death of his older brother in 1936, Carlo inherited the hereditary title of Count granted to their father in 1910.

The Count was a member of the ancient Sforza dynasty, descendant from a branch of the Dukes of Milan, and related to the Pallavicini family as well as other Italian families such as the Medici and Orsini. His wife Valentina Errembault de Dudzeele (1875 - 1969) was from an old and noble Belgian family.

After graduating in law from the University of Pisa, Sforza entered the diplomatic service in 1896. He served as consular attaché in Cairo (1896) and Paris (1897), then as consular secretary in Constantinople (1901) and Beijing. He was then appointed chargé d'affaires in Bucharest in 1905, but a diplomatic incident caused him to resign in December of the same year. Nevertheless, he was sent as private secretary of Marquis Emilio Visconti-Venosta, the Italian delegate to the Algeciras Conference.

Visconti-Venosta's recommendation earned him the post of first secretary of legation in Madrid (1906-1907), before being sent as chargé d'affaires in Constantinople (1908-1909) where he witnessed the Young Turk Revolution. Counsellor of Embassy at London in 1909, he then made his first experience of government as cabinet secretary of the Italian foreign minister for some months in the Fortis cabinet. From 1911 to 1915, he was sent back to Beijing where he witnessed the collapse of the Chinese Empire and renegotiated the statute of the Italian concession of Tientsin with the new Chinese authorities.

Sforza was in favour of an Italian intervention in the First World War on the side of the Allies. From 1915 to 1919, he was sent as ambassador in Corfu to the exiled Serbian government. After the First World War he became Italian foreign minister under Giovanni Giolitti. In 1921 Sforza upset nationalist right-wing forces by signing the Rapallo Treaty which recognised the important port of Fiume as a free city. As minister of Foreign Affairs he was instrumental in breaking the proto-fascist feud led by poet Gabriele D'Annunzio in Fiume. He remained foreign minister until the fall of the Giolitti cabinet on 4 July 1921.

Sforza was appointed ambassador to France in February 1922 but resigned from office nine months later on 31 October after Benito Mussolini had gained power. He led the anti-fascist opposition in the Senate until being forced into exile in 1926. While living in exile in Belgium, the native country of his wife, Sforza published the books, European Dictatorships, Contemporary Italy, or Synthesis of Europe, as well as many articles where he analysed the fascist ideology and attacked its many well-wishers as well as different "appeasers" in England, France and elsewhere. After the murder in France in 1937 of Carlo Rosselli, leader of the Giustizia e Libertà movement (non-marxist left), Count Sforza became the de facto leader of Italian antifascism in exile.

Sforza lived in Belgium and France until the German occupation in June 1940. He then settled in England where he lived until moving on to the United States, where he joined the antifascist Mazzini Society. Attending the Italian-American Congress in Montevideo, Uruguay, in August 1942, he presented an eight-point agenda for establishment of an Italian liberal democratic republic within the Atlantic Charter. The conference approved Sforza's agenda and acclaimed him "spiritual head of the Italian antifascists."

After the surrender in September 1943, he  returned to his country and in June 1944 he accepted the offer of Ivanoe Bonomi to join his provisional antifascist government. Sforza in 1946 became a member of the Italian Republican Party.

As foreign minister (1947–1951) he supported the European Recovery Program and the settlement of Trieste. He was a convinced advocate and one of the designers of Italy's pro-European policy and with De Gasperi he led Italy into the Council of Europe. On 18 April 1951 he signed the Treaty instituting the European Coal and Steel Community, making Italy one of the founder members.

Count Carlo Sforza died in Rome in 1952.

Family

On 4 March 1911 in Vienna, Sforza married a Belgian aristocrat, Countess Valentine Errembault de Dudzeele et d'Orroir (Bern 4 March 1875 - Rome, 31 January 1969), whose father, Count Gaston (1847-1929), was Belgian ambassador to Constantinople and later to Vienna, and whose brother, Count Gaston Errembault de Dudzeele, would marry in 1920 the widow of Prince Mirko of Montenegro, himself a brother-in-law of the King of Italy. As a child, Countess Valentina had been educated with the twin sons of a chambermaid of her mother: they were rumored to be the illegitimate sons of her father and one of them would become the father of Hergé, creator of Tintin.

Sforza and his wife had a daughter, Fiammetta (Beijing 3 October 1914 – 2002), who married Howard Scott ("a divorced father-of-two non-Catholic and penniless Englishman"), and a son, Count Sforza-Galeazzo («Sforzino») Sforza (Corfu 6 September 1916-Strasbourg 28 December 1977), a sculptor, for a time the lover of Argentine painter Leonor Fini, and later Deputy Secretary General of the Council of Europe (1968-1978). The latter first married Corinne Simon (1927-2011) and then Anne Spehner, but did not leave a son and at his death the title of Count passed to a cousin.

Carlo Sforza was also the alleged biological father of Konstanty Jeleński.

Honors 
 Grand cordon of the Order of Saints Maurice and Lazarus – December 21, 1919

 Knight Grand Cross of the Order of the Crown of Italy - February 29, 1920

 Knight of the Supreme Order of the Most Holy Annunciation - December 21, 1920

 Knight Grand Cross of the Colonial Order of the Star of Italy - November 25, 1920

 Cross of Liberty for Military Leadership, Grade I

Notes

Further reading

 Liebmann, George W. Diplomacy between the Wars: Five Diplomats and the Shaping of the Modern World (London  I. B. Tauris, 2008)
 Miller, Marion. "The Approaches to European Institution-Building of Carlo Sforza, Italian Foreign Minister, 1947–51." Building Postwar Europe (Palgrave Macmillan, London, 1995) pp. 55–69.

External links

 Photos of Carlo Sforza in Immaginario Diplomatico - collection of historical photos of Italian Diplomats by Stefano Baldi

19th-century Italian politicians
1872 births
1952 deaths
Counts of Italy
Italian nobility
People from the Province of Massa-Carrara
Carlo
Italian Republican Party politicians
Members of the Senate of the Kingdom of Italy
Members of the Constituent Assembly of Italy
Senators of Legislature I of Italy
Politicians of Tuscany
Ambassadors of Italy to France
Ambassadors of Italy to Serbia
Exiled Italian politicians
Members of the National Council (Italy)